La Unión is a pueblo (village) located in the municipality of Othón P. Blanco in the state of Quintana Roo, Mexico.

Geography 
La Unión is located on the left bank of the Hondo River, geographically located between 17º53'50 "N and 88º52'50" W, at about 13 meters above sea level. The village has a border port that connects with neighboring Blue Creek Village, Belize. There is an international bridge that connects both localities.

References 

Populated places in Quintana Roo